The Athletics are a Major League Baseball team that was originally based in Philadelphia.  They moved to Kansas City, Missouri in 1956 before moving to their current home, Oakland, California in 1968.  They have always played in the American League.  During the 20th century until their move to Kansas City, they played their home games primarily at two home ball parks – Columbia Park until 1908, and Shibe Park (renamed Connie Mack Stadium in 1953) from 1909 through 1967.  Their home ball park in Kansas City was Municipal Stadium. The first game of the new baseball season for a team is played on Opening Day, and being named the Opening Day starter is an honor, which is often given to the player who is expected to lead the pitching staff that season, though there are various strategic reasons why a team's best pitcher might not start on Opening Day.

The Athletics played their first game on April 26, 1901 at Columbia Park.  Chick Fraser was the Opening Day starter for that game, which the Athletics lost to the Washington Senators by a score of 5–1.  The Athletics used 45 different Opening Day starting pitchers in their 67 seasons  to moving to Oakland. The Athletics won 32 of those games against 35 losses in those Opening Day starts.

Lefty Grove and Alex Kellner had the most Opening Day starts for the Philadelphia and Kansas City Athletics with four.  Grove made four Opening Day starts for the Philadelphia Athletics in 1925, 1927, 1928 and 1930.  Kellner made two Opening Day starts for the Philadelphia Athletics in 1952 and 1953, and two Opening Day starts for the Kansas City Athletics in 1955 and 1956.  Eddie Plank (1904, 1909, 1910), Chief Bender (1905, 1906, 1911), Jack Coombs (1907, 1912, 1913), Scott Perry (1919–1921) and Phil Marchildon (1942, 1947, 1948) each made three Opening Day starts for the Philadelphia and Kansas City Athletics.  The other pitchers who made multiple Opening Day starts for the Philadelphia and Kansas City Athletics are Bullet Joe Bush, Sugar Cain, Chubby Dean, Lum Harris, Slim Harriss and Bobby Shantz.  Catfish Hunter made one Opening Day start for the Kansas City Athletics, but later made three Opening Day starts for the Oakland Athletics, giving him a total of four for the franchise.

In the ten years from 1904 through 1913 the Athletics used four different Opening Day starting pitchers.  Plank, Bender and Coombs each made three Opening Day starts during that span.  The other Opening Day start during that span was made by Nick Carter in 1908.  Carter made that start despite never having pitched in Major League Baseball prior to 1908 and, as it turned out, 1908 was Carter's only year in the Major Leagues.

When the Athletics moved to Kansas City in 1955, Alex Kellner was the Opening Day starting pitcher.  The Athletics won the game by a score of 6–2 over the Detroit Tigers.  Kellner was the Opening Day starter for the Athletics again in 1956.  However, in the 12 seasons from 1956 through their last season in Kansas City, 1967, the Athletics used a different Opening Day starting pitcher every season.

The Philadelphia Athletics were the American League champions nine times—1902, 1905, 1910, 1911, 1913, 1914 and 1929 through 1931.  They won the World Series five times, in 1910, 1911, 1913, 1929 and 1930 (no World Series was played in 1902).  In the seasons in which the Athletics won the World Series, their Opening Day starting pitchers were Plank (1910), Bender (1911), Coombs (1913), Carroll Yerkes (1929) and Grove (1930).  The Athletics lost their Opening Day game in 1910 and 1911, but won in 1913, 1929 and 1930.  The Kansas City Athletics never won and American League or World Series championship.

Key

Pitchers

References

Opening day starters
Lists of Major League Baseball Opening Day starting pitchers
Kansas City Athletics
Philadelphia Athletics